Matara Central College is a mixed school in Matara City. It is located in Matara District, southern part of Sri Lanka.

History

Matara Central College was Established in 1932. It was populated as central college and now it is established as a National School under category of the Ministry of Education, Sri Lanka.

School Flag

Blue and White are the school colors.

Matara Central College Today

Today Matara Central College has over 3000 students   and  they are guided by the  principal, six deputy  principals and    130 teachers.

Past Principals

Sports
 Athletics
 Chess
 Cricket
 Volleyball

College Houses
College Houses' names and colors:
 Sathya :gree 
 Maithree : Red 
 Shanthi : Yellow 
 Veerya : Green

External links 
 Official Website

1932 establishments in Ceylon
Educational institutions established in 1932
National schools in Sri Lanka
Schools in Matara, Sri Lanka